Jan Bols (born 27 August 1944 in Hoogeveen, Drenthe) is a former Dutch long track speed skater. Bols was among the top all-rounders in the late 60s and early 70s, this period overlapped the glory days of Kees Verkerk and Ard Schenk, so that he tends to be known as the third best Dutch skater of his time.

Bols participated in the 1968 and 1972 Olympics, but, as an all-rounder rather than a distance specialist, he did not win medals. His best results were a fifth place on the 1,500 m and a fourth place on the 10,000 m in 1972 in Sapporo. He also came in fourth at both the European and World all-round championships in 1970.

In 1971 he won the Dutch championships ahead of Verkerk and Schenk. He was in excellent shape at the European Championships in Heerenveen that year and finished second at both the 500m and 5000m the first day and was first in the standing. During the 5000m a failure to change lanes resulted in him skating two outer lanes in a row (i.e. he skated about 25 m longer) and a disqualification. The next day, his fans waved a commercial Bols flag half-staff in the stadium.

Bols did (bronze) medal in both the 1972 European and World all-round championships. The next year, he joined most top skaters in a short-lived professional league, finishing third and second in their championships in 1973 and 1974. After retiring from competitions in 1974 he ran a sporting goods shop in his hometown of Hoogeveen.

Personal records

Bols has an Adelskalender score of 168.513 points. He reached second place on this ranking list from 7 February 1970 to 16 January 1971 and would retain third place until March 1975.

World records

Source:

Tournament overview

 NC = No classification
<small>source:

Medals won

References

External links

 Jan Bols at SpeedSkatingStats.com
 Personal records from Jakub Majerski's Speedskating Database
 Evert Stenlund's Adelskalender pages
 Historical World Records. International Skating Union.
 History Dutch Championships Allround. Koninklijke Nederlandsche Schaatsenrijders Bond (Royal Dutch Skaters Association).

1944 births
Living people
People from Hoogeveen
Dutch male speed skaters
Olympic speed skaters of the Netherlands
Speed skaters at the 1968 Winter Olympics
Speed skaters at the 1972 Winter Olympics
World record setters in speed skating
World Allround Speed Skating Championships medalists
Sportspeople from Drenthe